A work permit or work visa is the permission to take a job within a foreign country.

European Union 

Currently, every EU country has a different process for granting work permits to nationals of non-EU countries. To address this issue, the European Commission began work in 1999 on developing an EU-wide process for the entry of non-EU nationals into the work force.  In October 2007, they adopted a proposal to introduce a work permit similar to the United States' "Green Card" program, called the "Blue Card". It is similar to the UK's Highly Skilled Migrant Programme, with the exception that it will require an employment contract in place prior to migration.  After two years in the first country, the migrant will be allowed to move and work in another EU country, and can sum the number of years spent in the EU for purposes of residency. This new card will abolish work permits across the EU and centralize the issuing from Brussels.

Belgium

Czech Republic
The issuing of work permit in the Czech Republic is governed by three basic sources: labor code, Act No. 435/2004 Coll. On employment and Act no. 326/1999 Coll. On the residence of foreign nationals. There are various rights and obligations depending on nationality.

France
A foreigner seeking to work in France must obtain work authorization with a visa, a residence permit or a special document by the government.

United Kingdom

There are seven standard ways to apply for a work permit in the United Kingdom: the Business and Commercial Arrangements, the Training and Work Experience Arrangements, the Sports people and Entertainers Arrangements, Student Internships, GATS, Ancestry Visa and the Sectors Based Scheme. All applications require the work permit holder to leave the country where the work permit was issued every three months under the Work Permit Arrangements. Costs for leaving the airport are £64, per person and you must return to the airport after 24 hours or one working day to leave the country. If you remain in the airport the cost is £35 per person and you must leave the country after 24 hours or one working day in the airport. Each of these involves its own application process, and generally requires a job offer from a UK employer.

The UK work permit system is currently being replaced by a new points-based immigration system.

Russia
According to the Federal Migration Service of Russia estimates, in Russia today there are 5 million working foreign nationals.

In order to work in Russia, foreign citizens must have a work visa (visa firms for arriving at the order) to obtain a work permit and get on migration registration in the Russian Federal Migration Service bodies.

For foreign citizens arriving without visas (CIS countries except Turkmenistan and Georgia) there is a simplified procedure. The period of temporary stay for them is 90 days, but can be extended up to one year from the date of entry into the Russian Federation on presentation of the migration service of the employment contract or a contract of civil-legal nature. That is, a foreigner can obtain a work permit for up to 90 days, and then to extend it after the job. However, it is recommended to immediately impose a labor or civil contract and to issue a work permit for the duration of its validity.

Issuance of work permits is carried out taking into account the established quota. The quota is divided by region, Russia and the integrated vocational qualification groups.

A work permit is divided to some categories:
Qualified professionals are employed by their existing profession (specialty), included in the approved list of professions (specialties, positions);
Highly qualified professionals engaged in labor activity in accordance with the provisions of Article 13 of the Federal Law "On the Legal Status of Foreign Citizens in the Russian Federation."
The work permit is valid within the subject of the Russian Federation, in which it was issued.

Ukraine 
Foreigners and stateless persons can be employed in Ukraine after obtaining an appropriate permit. These requirements are established by article 42 of the Law of Ukraine "On Employment". State Employment Service of Ukraine is the main authority to issue work permit.

Does not require obtaining a work permit for:
 foreigners who have residence permit in Ukraine;
 refugees;
 foreigners who have permission to immigrate to Ukraine;
 foreigners who are recognized as persons in need of additional protection, or who are granted temporary protection in Ukraine;
 representatives of foreign maritime (river) fleet and airlines that serve such companies on the territory of Ukraine;
 employees of foreign media who are accredited to work in Ukraine;
 professional athletes, artists and art workers to work in Ukraine;
 workers of emergency services for urgent work;
 employees of foreign representative (branch) office that are registered in the territory of Ukraine in accordance with the procedure established by the law;
 ecclesiastic who are to reside in Ukraine temporarily (on the ground of invitation of religious organization) for canonical activity only in such religious organization;
 foreigners who arrived in Ukraine to participate in the implementation of international technical assistance projects;
 foreigners who arrived in Ukraine to conduct teaching and / or scientific activities in higher education institutions;
 other foreigners in cases provided by laws and international treaties of Ukraine;
 Obtaining work permit in Ukraine is one of the basics to obtain residence permit.

United States 

In general, the United States does not require work permits for adult citizens. However, certain aliens are required to have an Employment Authorization Document from the United States Citizenship and Immigration Services (USCIS) of the Department of Homeland Security (DHS).

The federal government of the United States does not require work permits or proof-of-age certificates for a minor to be employed. However, the possession of an age certificate constitutes a good faith effort to comply with minimum age requirements of the Fair Labor Standards Act of 1938. The United States Department of Labor will issue a "certificate of age" if the minor employee's state does not issue them, or if the minor is requested by his or her employer to provide one. Several states are not listed in (a), such as Alaska, Arizona, Idaho, Kansas, Mississippi, South Carolina, Texas, and Utah, and thus their certificates may not meet the requirements of (b) as being evidence of compliance with the Fair Labor Standards Act.

Many states also require them for workers of certain ages. In some states, for example New Jersey, permits are only required for minors 14 and 15 years old, while others such as Massachusetts require, at least in theory, work permits for all minors until they turn 18 years of age. In some states, enforcement is strict. Permits are usually issued through the school system the minor attends, and typically at a minimum is conditioned on enrollment in high school with regular attendance (no chronic absenteeism, tardiness, or truancy). Some states such as New York and Indiana require high school students with part-time jobs to maintain a certain grade point average. Minors who are working are usually restricted in the number of hours each day or week they are permitted to work as well as the types of jobs they may hold.

Turkey 

All applications for both residence permit and work permit are made through online government portals. The residence permit application is made through "  "e-Residence" (e-İkamet) while  application are made through e-Government (Turkey) (e-Devlet).

South Africa
The South African Immigration Act as amended and which came into effect on 26 May 2014, makes provision for three different categories work visas that a foreigner may apply for to work in South Africa. These are the General Work Visa, the Critical Skills Work Visa and the Intra-Company Transfer Work Visa.

General Work Visa - 
This work visa is based on an offer of employment from a South African prospective employer. The employer must apply to the Department of Labour (DOL) for a certification which will confirm to the DHA directly confirmation of whether there exists suitably qualified South African candidates for the position and that the foreign Applicant possess the necessary skills and qualifications for the offered position. Once the DOL has concluded its mandate and conveyed to the DHA its certification (either positive or negative) the Applicant will then file the visa application. The DHA will approve or refuse a general work visa application, depending on its compliance with the statutory scheme the DOL issues a positive certification. 

Critical Skills Work Visa - 
A critical skills work visa may be issued to a foreigner on the basis of educational qualifications and/or professional experiences for up to 5 years when the application is supported by a contract of employment or for 1 year in absence of the supporting contract of employment. Skills that are recognised to be critical in terms of South African immigration are listed in the Critical Skills List which is published in the Government Gazzette.  Each skill is listed as critical specifically to a sector of employment. The sector is relevant not only in respect of the specific requirements including the applicable SAQA recognised professional body but also in respect of the supporting employment which needs to be within that specific sector. 

Intra-Company Transfer Work Visa  - 
An intra company transfer (ICT) work visa is issued to a foreigner who can demonstrate to have been employed by a foreign entity for at least 6 months and who, based on his/her foreign employment, deployed or seconded to South African branch, subsidiary or associate office of the corporate entity aboard. A skills transfer plan needs to support the application.  An Intra-Company-Transfer work visa does not allow its holder to change status from within South Africa.  The visa is issued for up to 4 years and cannot be renewed from within South Africa.  Holding an ICT work visa does not accrue its holder any rights in terms of applying for permanent residence in South Africa.

Canada
Canada work permits are issued under the Temporary Foreign Worker Program (TFWP) by Canada immigration and Citizenship.

The TFWP has four streams: high-skilled workers, low-skilled workers, the Seasonal Agricultural Worker Program, and the Live-In Caregiver Program.

The Canadian work permit is divided into two which include are the “open work permits” and “employer-specific work permits.” With an open work permit, an applicant can work for any employer, but an employer-specific work permit allows the applicant to work for only one employer.

It is required that you already have a job offer before applying for a work permit, although in some cases, you can apply for a work permit without a job offer.

For a foreigner to apply for a work permit in Canada, they would have to apply for a Labour Market Impact Assessment (LMIA) from Employment and Social Development Canada (ESDC), as this is the most used approach. It would then be the duty of the Canadian employer to undertake domestic recruitment efforts and agrees that no Canadian permanent residents or citizens are qualified for the position at hand. After a positive LMIA has been issued to the applicant, they can go ahead to apply for a work permit.

Philippines
In the Philippines, legal employment of a foreigner in the country for a period of more than six months requires an alien employment permit (AEP) which is issued by the Department of Labor and Employment. A special working permit (SWP) issued by the Bureau of Immigration is required instead for foreigners intending to work in the country for a period of less than six months.

Singapore
In Singapore, the Ministry of Manpower (MOM) issues work passes to eligible foreigners in accordance to the Employment of Foreign Manpower Act (EFMA).

There are three main categories of work passes:
Work Permit (WP) - for unskilled and semi-skilled workers. Subject to quota, levy and nationality requirements. Not allowed to bring family members to Singapore. Not eligible to apply for permanent residence. Marriage restrictions apply; current or former WP holders must seek approval from MOM before marrying a Singapore citizen or permanent resident.
Subsets of Work Permit include Work Permit for foreign domestic worker, Work Permit for confinement nanny and Work Permit for performing artiste working in public entertainment outlets.
S Pass (SP) - for mid-level skilled staff and technicians earning a fixed monthly salary of at least S$2,300. Subject to quota and levy requirements but not subject to nationality restriction. Allowed to bring family members to Singapore if earning a fixed monthly salary of at least S$6,000. Eligible to apply for permanent residence.
Employment Pass (EP) - for professionals, managers and executives earning a fixed monthly salary of at least S$3,600. Not subject to quota, levy and nationality requirements, but fair consideration must be given to qualified local jobseekers. Allowed to bring family members to Singapore if earning a fixed monthly salary of at least S$6,000. Eligible to apply for permanent residence.
A special type of EP is the Personalised Employment Pass (PEP). An EP holder can apply for a PEP if he/she earns a fixed monthly salary of at least S$12,000. For foreign executives relocating to Singapore and applying for a PEP, their last drawn fixed monthly salary must be at least S$18,000. The PEP is not tied to a particular employer, and the PEP holder can spend up to six months unemployed in Singapore. The PEP is valid for up to 3 years and non-renewable.

Other types of work passes include EntrePass (allowing entrepreneurs to set up businesses in Singapore), Work Holiday Pass (for eligible foreign students to work and holiday in Singapore), Training Employment Pass (short-term training for professionals) and Training Work Permit (short-term training for semi-skilled trainees).

In November 2020, the Singapore government announced plans for a new work pass called Tech.Pass, which will be available to applicants by January 2021. According to the Economic Development Board the Tech.Pass will be valid for two years, and is meant to attract skilled technology professionals in fields like e-commerce, artificial intelligence and cyber security.

Notes:
 a number of locals (Singapore citizens or permanent residents) must be employed by the employer before a foreign worker can be hired
 a daily or monthly tax on each foreign worker, borne by the employer

Australia
Several different types of visas are available for immigrants.

Thailand 
Foreigners holding a "B" visa and wishing to work or start a business in Thailand are required to obtain a work permit. The issuance of work permits is under the jurisdiction of the Ministry of Labor of Thailand. Work without permission in the Kingdom is criminally punishable. It takes 7 working days to process the application for a permit. If the applicant is qualified and able to use "One Stop Service Center", the work permit will only take one day.

Duties 
Thai government fees for a work permit:
100 Baht/form = Permit application Fee.
750 Baht = work permit not longer than 3 months.
1,500 Baht = work permit longer than 3 months but does not exceed 6 months.
3,000 Baht = work permit longer than 6 months but does not exceed 12 months.
Thai government fees for amendments:
500 Baht/Book = Substitute of a permit.
1,000 Baht/time = Permission to change or add job description.
3,000 Baht/time = Permission to remove or add an employer.
1,000 Baht/time = Permission to change or add the locality or place of work.
150 Baht/time = Permission to change or add conditions.
According to the Emergency Decree on Non-Thais' Working Management No. 2, 2018, foreigners can work anywhere in the country without having to record these changes in the permit, but each employer must be listed in the book. If the employee is transferred to another office in another part of the country, the employer should notify the office of the Employment Department.

Professions that are prohibited for foreigners 
The Thai Ministry of Labor has developed a list of professions that foreigners are prohibited from working in the Kingdom. This is done so that the local population does not suffer from unemployment due to the influx of immigrants.
List of prohibited professions:
Labour work except labour work in fishing boats under the next category below. The said work which is forbidden to aliens shall not apply to aliens who have entered into Thailand under an agreement on hire of labour concluded between the Government of Thailand and other nations, and also aliens whose status has been prescribed as legal immigrant and who possess a residence certificate under the law governing immigration.
Agriculture, animal husbandry, forestry or fishery, except work requiring specialized knowledge, farm supervision, or labour work in fishing boats, particularly marine fishery.
Bricklaying, carpentry, or other construction work.
Wood carving.
Driving motor vehicles or vehicles which do not use machinery or mechanical devices, except piloting aircraft internationally.
Front shop sales and auction sale work.
Supervising, auditing, or giving service in accountancy, except occasional internal auditing.
Cutting or polishing precious or semi-precious stones.
Haircutting, hairdressing, or beautification.
Cloth weaving by hand.
Mat weaving or making utensils from reed, rattan, jute, hay, or bamboo.
Making rice paper by hand.
Lacquer work.
Making Thai musical instruments.
Niello work.
Goldsmith, silversmith, or gold/copper alloy smith work.
Stone work.
Making Thai dolls.
Making mattresses or quilts.
Making alms bowls.
Making silk products by hand.
Making Buddha images.
Knifemaking.
Making paper or cloth umbrellas.
Making shoes.
Making hats.
Brokerage or agency except in international trading.
Professional civil engineering concerning design and calculation, systemization, analysis, planning, testing, construction supervision, or consulting services, excluding work requiring specialized techniques.
Professional architectural work concerning design, drawing/making, cost estimation, or consulting services.
Dressmaking.
Pottery.
Cigarette rolling by hand.
Tour guiding or conducting.
Hawking of goods & Thai typesetting by hand.
Unwinding and twisting silk by hand.
Clerical or secretarial work.
Providing legal services or engaging in legal work, except arbitration work; and work relating to defense of cases at arbitration level, provided the law governing the dispute under consideration by the arbitrators is not Thai law, or it is a case where there is no need to apply for the enforcement of such arbitration award in Thailand.

See also
 Employment contract: proofs that a person has indeed acquired a work contract in a particular country
 Expatriate
 Stamp 4

References

Labour law
Legal documents
Immigration law
Employment of foreign-born